Big Warrior or Tustanagee Thlucco (Tvstanagi Rakkē in Mvskokē «Big Warrior»  < rak·kē «big») was a principal chief of the Creek Nation until his death in 1826.

The name Tustanagee Thlucco is actually a war title, "great warrior," given to the man who led all the warriors of a town. No other Creek name is recorded for Big Warrior.

Big Warrior was from the town of Tukabatchee. It is said that his father was of Piankashaw descent and his mother was Tukabatchee. He married the abandoned wife of Efa Haco, a Tukabatchee woman named Tefvhoe. He spoke little, to no English. General Thomas Woodward described Big Warrior as the largest man that he had ever seen among the Creeks and as spotted as a leopard.  He would become Mekko (chief) of Tukabatchee in the early 1800s and Principal Chief of the Upper Creeks. He did not like or trust the Americans, but believed it was in the Nations best interests to ally themselves with them. Big Warrior's policies made him a target of the Red Sticks during the Creek Civil War. Tukabatchee was surrounded by Red Sticks in 1813 and its inhabitants had to find asylum in Koweta, among the Lower Creeks. Tukabatchee would be rebuilt following the end of the Creek Civil War in 1814. Big Warrior was one of the signees of the Treaty of Fort Jackson and was angered to find that his loyalty to the United States had meant nothing and that the U.S. was demanding the secession of even more land from the Creeks. He died in February 1825, while in Washington D.C. with delegation of Creeks. He had two sons, Tuskenea and Yargee and at least two daughters. Tuskenea would replace Big Warrior as Mekko of Tukabatchee who would be succeeded by Opothleyahola a few years later.

In 1811 Big Warrior welcomed Tecumseh to Tukabatchee to deliver his message of pan-tribal unity and hostility to the United States. Nevertheless, Big Warrior remained firmly on the U.S. side during the Creek War of 1813-14. The Treaty of Fort Jackson forced harsh settlement terms on the entire Creek Nation. In the following decade Big Warrior became an opponent of further land cessions.

Big Warrior, representing the Upper Towns of the Creek Nation, shared the leadership of the Creek National Council with Little Prince, principal chief of the Lower Towns.

References 

1826 deaths
Native American leaders
Native American people of the Indian Wars
Year of birth unknown
Muscogee people
18th-century Native Americans
19th-century Native Americans